Panther Creek is a small creek on Eglin Air Force Base, near Navarre, Florida.

References 

Navarre, Florida
Bodies of water of Santa Rosa County, Florida